Jack "Machine Gun Jack" McGurn (born Vincenzo Antonio Gibaldi; ; July 2, 1902 – February 15, 1936) was a Sicilian-American boxer, mobster, and eventually a made man and caporegime in Al Capone's Chicago Outfit.

Early life
McGurn was born in July 1902 in Licata, Sicily, the eldest son of Tommaso and Giusepina (née Verderame) Gibaldi. Four years later, he and his mother emigrated to join his father in the United States of America, arriving at Ellis Island on November 24, 1906. McGurn grew up in Red Hook, Brooklyn where he went to Public School 46 on Union Street between Henry and Hicks streets, according to underworld historian Bill Balsamo, author of Crime Incorporated. 

McGurn moved to Chicago when he was 14 where he later took up a career in boxing as a teenager and changed his name to "Battling" Jack McGurn because boxers with Irish names got the better bookings. After Tommaso's death while McGurn was still young, his mother remarried to grocer Angelo DeMory, who was later murdered by Black Hand extortionists.

Prohibition

McGurn was introduced to Capone after his stepfather, Angelo DeMory, was assassinated by gang extortionists on January 28, 1923, and McGurn had methodically avenged his death by killing the three hitmen responsible. In fact, McGurn was already on the Outfit's payroll by the time of DeMory's death and had probably come to Capone's attention through his budding career as a prizefighter.

One of McGurn’s most high-profile hits was the assassination of North Side Gang leader Earl “Hymie” Weiss on October 11, 1926.  McGurn is reputed to have used his trademark Tommy Gun as he gunned down the gang leader from an open window across the street from Holy Name Cathedral.

McGurn had part ownership of a speakeasy jazz club, a venue which still exists today, the infamous Green Mill, at 4802 North Broadway, in the middle of the rival "Bugs" Moran gang's territory. In November 1927, manager Danny Cohen gave McGurn the task of "persuading" comedian/singer Joe E. Lewis not to move his act south to the New Rendezvous Café, at North Clark Street and West Diversey Parkway. Lewis refused, and McGurn slit Lewis's throat, cutting off a portion of his tongue and leaving him for dead. Miraculously, Lewis eventually recovered and resumed his career, but his voice never regained its lush sound.

St. Valentine's Day Massacre
McGurn is associated with planning the St. Valentine's Day Massacre, in 1929, though this association has not been proven.

Although police charged McGurn in the case, he was never brought to trial largely due to his "blonde alibi" — girlfriend and later wife Louise Rolfe — who claimed they spent the whole day together.

Later years
In April 1930, when Frank J. Loesch, chairman of the Chicago Crime Commission compiled his "Public Enemies" list of the top 28 people he saw as corrupting Chicago, McGurn's name was fourth on the list, which was published nationwide.

This notoriety caused him to be shunned by the Outfit. McGurn, who had great hand-eye coordination, subsequently attempted a career as a professional golfer. McGurn was a silent partner in Evergreen Golf Course, at 91st Street and Western Avenue, a known mob hangout where he could often be found playing, practicing, giving lessons, or drinking and playing cards in the clubhouse. Dan Lilly was known to have caddied for him once and claimed that he kept a machine gun in his golf bag at all times. FBI documents released in December 1999 revealed that singer Bing Crosby, who frequently played golf in Chicago, was one of McGurn's golfing partners.

On August 25, 1933, the Western Open golf championship began at Olympia Fields Country Club in the far south suburb of Olympia Fields. A reasonably skilled golfer and flashy dresser, McGurn entered the competition as Vincent Gebhardi (another version of his real name), the professional at public Evergreen Golf Course. In the opening round, McGurn carded a 13-over-par 83 on course No. 4 (today's North Course). The next morning, the name "Gebhardi" on the day's pairing sheet was observed by an alert Chicago Police chief detective, who sent two sergeants to arrest him. "Aware of McGurn's truculent temper", the Chicago Tribune account reported, "the sergeants enlisted the help of Lt. Frank McGillen and five policemen from the Homewood station of the county highway force".

McGurn was playing much better the second day. The group of burly officers accosted McGurn on the seventh green and told him he was under arrest under a warrant issued the day before under the "criminal reputation law". He was accompanied by his wife, the glitzy "Blonde Alibi" Louise Rolfe. Wearing a tight, thin white dress and sporting a three-carat diamond ring, she approached the policemen and snapped, "Whose brilliant idea was this?" McGurn politely asked to finish his round. Amused, the plainclothesmen agreed and became part of his gallery. But the police presence began to unnerve McGurn and his game suddenly went sour. He came in with a 16-over-par 86 for a 36-hole total of 169, 14 strokes above making the cut.

Death
Less than three years later, McGurn, by then impoverished and cast out of the Outfit, was assassinated by three men with pistols on February 15, 1936, one day after the seventh anniversary of the St. Valentine's Day massacre. He was bowling at the second-floor Avenue Recreation Bowling Alley, at 805 N. Milwaukee Avenue in Chicago.

McGurn's assassins tossed a Valentine card with a prophetic poem near to his body: 
"You've lost your job, you've lost your dough,
Your jewels and cars and handsome houses, 
But things could still be worse you know... 
At least you haven't lost your trousers!".

He was laid to rest at Mount Carmel Cemetery in Hillside, Illinois.

After McGurn's murder, his half-brother, Anthony De Mory, angrily said, "I know the guys who killed Jack. I'm going to get them". On March 2, 1936, however, De Mory was fatally shot by three masked men inside a Chicago pool hall. The Chicago Police Department linked the assassination to McGurn's slaying.

The identity of McGurn's killers remains unknown, but research and speculation by criminologists suggest three possible theories: 
1. Revenge by former Irish mob boss George "Bugs" Moran, who McGurn had tried to kill almost seven years before.
2. A contract killing ordered by the Chicago Outfit under Frank Nitti, because McGurn (an alcoholic and a braggart), had become a liability due to his extensive inside knowledge of the American Mafia. 
3. Revenge by James Gusenberg, the brother of Frank and Peter Gusenberg, who were both murdered during the St. Valentine's Day Massacre.

In popular culture
McGurn has been portrayed in several movies including The St. Valentine's Day Massacre (1967) by Clint Ritchie, Capone (1975) with Carmen Argenziano, The Verne Miller Story (1987) by Frank Costa and Gangster Land (2017) by Sean Faris. He was also played by K. L. Smith in the original The Untouchables television series and by Paul Stevens in the Playhouse 90 episode "Seven Against the Wall", depicting his role in the St. Valentine's Day Massacre.
 McGurn's attempted killing of Joe E. Lewis was later immortalized in the movie The Joker Is Wild (1957), with Frank Sinatra as Lewis, Ted de Corsia as Georgie Parker (Danny Cohen) and Leonard Graves as Tim Coogan (McGurn).

References

Bibliography

External links

Green Mill Jazz Club website: The Green Mill Jazz Club History
Jack McGurn at My Al Capone Museum

1902 births
1936 deaths
1936 murders in the United States
Italian emigrants to the United States
American gangsters of Italian descent
Al Capone associates
Mafia hitmen
Murdered American gangsters of Sicilian descent
Chicago Outfit mobsters
People murdered by the Chicago Outfit
Prohibition-era gangsters
People murdered in Illinois
Male murder victims
Deaths by firearm in Illinois
Burials at the Bishop's Mausoleum, Mount Carmel Cemetery (Hillside)